Lyonsifusus ansatus is a species of sea snail, a marine gastropod mollusk in the family Fasciolariidae, the spindle snails, the tulip snails and their allies.

Description

Distribution

References

 Lamarck J.B. (1816). Liste des objets représentés dans les planches de cette livraison. In: Tableau encyclopédique et méthodique des trois règnes de la Nature. Mollusques et Polypes divers. Agasse, Paris. 16 pp.
 Weisbord, N. E. 1962. Late Cenozoic gastropods from northern Venezuela. Bulletins of American Paleontology 42(193):1-672, 48 pls.
 Macsotay O. & Campos R. (2001). Moluscos representativos de la plataforma de Margarita, Venezuela. Published by the authors, Valencia, Venezuela, iii + 280 pp., 32 pl.
 Daccarett, E. Y. & Bossio, V. S. 2011. Colombian Seashells from the Caribbean Sea. L'Informatore Piceno. 384pp.
 Vermeij G.J. & Snyder M.A. (2018). Proposed genus-level classification of large species of Fusininae (Gastropoda, Fasciolariidae). Basteria. 82(4-6): 57-82

External links
 Gmelin J.F. (1791). Vermes. In: Gmelin J.F. (Ed.) Caroli a Linnaei Systema Naturae per Regna Tria Naturae, Ed. 13. Tome 1(6). G.E. Beer, Lipsiae [Leipzig]. pp. 3021-3910
 Röding P.F. (1798). Museum Boltenianum sive Catalogus cimeliorum e tribus regnis naturæ quæ olim collegerat Joa. Fried Bolten, M. D. p. d. per XL. annos proto physicus Hamburgensis. Pars secunda continens Conchylia sive Testacea univalvia, bivalvia & multivalvia. Trapp, Hamburg. viii, 199 pp.
 Lamarck, [J.-B. M.] de. (1822). Histoire naturelle des animaux sans vertèbres. Tome septième. Paris: published by the Author, 711 pp.
 Philippi, R. A. (1847-1851). Abbildungen und Beschreibungen neuer oder wenig gekannter Conchylien. Dritter Band. Cassel: Fischer. 1-138, pls 1-24
 Lyons W.G. & Snyder M.A. (2019). Fasciolariidae (Gastropoda: Neogastropoda) of French Guiana and nearby regions, with descriptions of two new species and comments on marine zoogeography of northeastern South America. Zootaxa. 4585(2): 239-268

Lyonsifusus ansatus
Gastropods described in 1791